Dorian Gray is the main character of the novel The Picture of Dorian Gray (1890) by Oscar Wilde.

Dorian Gray may also refer to:

Film
 Dorian Gray (1970 film), an Italian film adaptation of the novel
 Dorian Gray (2009 film), a British film adaptation of the novel

People
 Dorian Gray (actress) (1936–2011), the stage name of the Italian film actress Maria Luisa Mangini
 Dorian Gray (UK singer), the stage name of English pop singer Tony Ellingham
 Soren Mounir, a Swiss singer-songwriter also known as "Dorian Gray"

Other uses
 Dorian Gray (club), a nightclub in Frankfurt am Main, Germany
 Dorian Gray (band), a 1980s Croatian music group
 Dorian Gray (Bourne), a contemporary dance adaptation of the novel

See also
 Adaptation of The Picture of Dorian Gray, for further books, films, musicals and plays  based on the novel
 Dorian Gray syndrome
 The Picture of Dorian Gray (disambiguation)